Hymns to Victory is a compilation album of the American heavy metal band Virgin Steele. It was released in January 2002 by Noise Records, to celebrate the twentieth anniversary of the band, together with the album The Book of Burning.

Track listing
All lyrics by David DeFeis. Music by David DeFeis except tracks 8, 10, 12 by DeFeis / Edward Pursino

 "Flames of Thy Power (From Blood They Rise)"  – 5:38
 "Through the Ring of Fire"  – 5:25
 "Invictus"  – 5:35
 "Crown of Glory (Unscarred) (In Fury mix)"  – 6:40
 "Kingdom of the Fearless (The Destruction of Troy)"  – 7:39
 "The Spirit of Steele (acoustic version)"  – 3:24
 "A Symphony of Steele (Battle mix)"  – 5:20
 "The Burning of Rome (Cry for Pompeii)"  – 6:38
 "I Will Come for You"  – 5:48
 "Saturday Night"  – 4:09
 "Noble Savage (early mix)"  – 7:06
 "Mists of Avalon"  – 5:09
 "Emalaith"  – 9:55

Tracks 1, 2, 3, 5, 8, 9, 13 remastered Track 4, 7, 11 previously unreleased alternate mix 
Track 6 previously unreleased acoustic version Tracks 10, 12 previously unreleased songs

Members
David DeFeis – Lead vocals, keyboards and orchestration, swords on 5, 8, bass on 1, 3, 8, all instruments on 6
Edward Pursino  – guitars, bass on 2, 4, 5, 7, 9, 10, 12
Frank Gilchriest – drums on 1, 2, 3
Joey Ayvazian  – drums on 7, 8, 9, 10, 11
Joe O'Reilly  – bass on 11
Steve Young – slide guitar solo on 12

References

Virgin Steele albums
2002 compilation albums
Noise Records compilation albums